Marion Moss Hartog (22 October 182129 October 1907) was an English Jewish poet, author, and educator. She was the editor of the first Jewish women's periodical, The Jewish Sabbath Journal.

Biography

Early life
Marion Moss was born at Portsmouth on 22 October 1821, one of twelve children of Amelia and Joseph Moss. Her great-grandfather was one of the founders of the Portsmouth Jewish community, and her grandmother, Sarah Davids, was the first Jewish child born in Portsmouth. Moss was educated by her parents, and at an early age began with her sister Celia the composition of poems and stories.

In 1838 the sisters published by subscription a book of poems entitled Early Efforts, influenced in part by classical Jewish texts and the works of Late-Romantic female poets like Felicia Hemans and L.E.L. Among other poems, the volume includes various laments for Jerusalem and a narrative documentary of the York Massacre of 1190, as well as thematically-non-Jewish poems such as The Battle of Bannockburn and Amy Robsart's Complaint to the Earl of Leicester. The book was successful enough for a second edition to be called for the following year.

Career
In 1840 she and Celia published three volumes of tales entitled The Romance of Jewish History, along the lines of Leitch Ritchie's Romance of French History. Each chapter consisted of a "Historical Summary" of some particular period of Jewish history, followed by a story which the authors had woven round the principal events. Among the subscribers to the work were Sir Edward Bulwer-Lytton (to whom it was dedicated), Lord Palmerston, and Sir Moses Montefiore. These volumes were followed by Tales of Jewish History (1843).

By this time, Moss was engaged in literary work for different publications. She contributed "The Gift and the Loan," and other tales, to the Bradford Observer, which were afterwards reproduced by Isaac Leeser in the Occident. She also contributed to the Metropolitan Magazine, and subsequently the Jewish Chronicle and Jewish World.

A little later Moss went to London and gained a livelihood as a teacher. In August 1845, she married Paris-born Alphonse Hartog, with whom she had been taking French lessons, and shortly after her marriage established a boarding and day school for young children, which she continued to conduct until her retirement in 1884. Hartog's pupils included her niece Sarah Marks, who moved in with the Hartog family upon the death of her father in 1861.

The Jewish Sabbath Journal
In early 1855, Hartog founded the first Jewish women's periodical, The Jewish Sabbath Journal; A Penny and Moral Magazine for the Young, consisting of stories, verses, and religious addresses. The disapproval of Abraham Benisch, however, precluded her from publishing notices in The Jewish Chronicle, and subscriptions soon fell off. The journal's fourteenth and final issue was published on 8 June 1855, and ended with the poem "On the Death of My Beloved Child".

Later life and death

Hartog wrote little for the remaining 52 years of her life. She died on 29 October 1907 at her home in Kilburn, London, at the age of eighty-six. Many of her children were eminent. Of her sons, Numa Edward Hartog was Senior Wrangler at Cambridge; Marcus and Sir Philip Hartog were distinguished men of science. Her daughters were Héléna Arsène Darmesteter, the portrait-painter, and Cécile Hartog, the composer and pianist.

Partial bibliography

References

1821 births
1907 deaths
People from Portsea, Portsmouth
English women writers
English Jewish writers
Jewish women writers
Jewish poets
19th-century women writers
Jewish educators
19th-century English educators
English women educators
Romantic poets
Women magazine editors
English magazine editors
British women short story writers
English short story writers
19th-century English women